Heart TV (stylized as 'heartv') was a British 24-hour pop music television channel owned by Global as a brand extension of radio's Heart network. The channel played music videos from the 1970s, 1980s, 1990s, 2000s and 2010s (including romantic music and film scores).

It reached 927,000 viewers on average per month on Sky alone.

History

On 3 July 2012, Global announced it would launch a TV channel of the same name, Heart. The channels could also be watched via dedicated iOS and Android apps, as well as online. Both channels played non-stop music videos 24 hours a day, 7 days a week and also featured live coverage for major musical events across the UK. On 24 July 2012 it was confirmed BSkyB would be responsible for ad sales on both channels, likewise with the radio station, Heart TV was aimed at a target audience of housewives with children.

In February 2015, Global were reprimanded by the media regulator Ofcom following an incident in October 2014 during which Heart TV played 72 seconds more than the permitted amount of advertising during one particular hour. Global said the incident had occurred because a commercial break was pushed to the end of an hour by software controlling its output, creating too much advertising time for the following hour.

The channel originally aimed to play “more music variety” (similar to the radio), however, after the slogan was changed in February 2017 to “Turn Up the Feel Good”, it said “more feel good music”.

It was removed from Freesat on 10 October 2018, and on Sky the next day, along with Capital TV, and all mentions of it have disappeared from the Heart website. The first music video aired on the channel was “My Kind of Love” by Emeli Sandé and the last music video was "Locked Out of Heaven" by Bruno Mars before the channel ceased at 6am.

References

Global Radio
Music video networks in the United Kingdom
Television channels and stations established in 2012
Television channels and stations disestablished in 2018
Defunct television channels in the United Kingdom